Michael Holman is a British linguist and Slavicist, fluent in Russian, Bulgarian, German and French.  He studied at Lincoln College, Oxford and University of Leipzig, and worked for the University of Leeds in 1966–1999.

Together with the Bulgarian linguists A. Danchev, E. Dimova and M. Savova, Holman developed a system for the English-oriented Romanization of Bulgarian known as Danchev System. He translated Nikolai Haitov's Wild Tales from Bulgarian (published by Owen in 1979) and authored the best-selling Teach Yourself Bulgarian Series (with M. Kovatcheva).

Honours
DLitt honoris causa from Sofia University in 2005.

Publications
 A. Danchev, M. Holman, E. Dimova, M. Savova, An English Dictionary of Bulgarian Names: Spelling and Pronunciation, Nauka i Izkustvo Publishers, 1989, 288 pp.
 M. Holman, M. Kovatcheva. Teach Yourself Bulgarian: Complete Course Package, McGraw-Hill (2nd edition), 2004. 
 M. Holman, M. Kovatcheva Complete Bulgarian McGraw-Hill 2011. 
 M. Kovatcheva, M. Holman Speak Bulgarian with confidence. Audio-course. Hodder&Stoughton 2010.

External links
 Professor Michael Holman, University of Leeds website.

Living people
Linguists from England
Year of birth missing (living people)
Alumni of Lincoln College, Oxford
Leipzig University alumni